Kolomensky (masculine), Kolomenskaya (feminine), or Kolomenskoye (neuter) may refer to:
Kolomensky District, a district of Moscow Oblast, Russia
Kolomensky (inhabited locality) (Kolomenskaya, Kolomenskoye), name of several rural localities in Russia
Kolomenskoye, a former royal estate in Moscow, Russia